Mitchell Gregory Reginald Austin (born 3 April 1991) is a professional association football player who plays as a winger.

Born in England to an Australian father, Austin began his senior career at Stalybridge Celtic in 2010. Three years later, he joined Cambridge United and, after loans to Lincoln City, Brackley Town and Southport in 2014, Austin moved to Australian side Central Coast Mariners in 2015. He remained in Australia for four further years, playing at Melbourne Victory, Newcastle Jets and Sydney FC. In 2019 Austin moved to Scotland, playing one year for Partick Thistle.

Early life
Mitch Austin was born in Rochdale, Greater Manchester on 3 April 1991. He has a twin sister named Brittany. His father is the Australian rugby league, and rugby union footballer Greg Austin. He left England at the age of eight when his father retired from playing professional rugby and moved the family back to Australia.

Club career

Youth football
Mitch Austin was a Manly United junior in Sydney, Australia. He was spotted by the scouts of Rotherham United in 2009 whilst on a tour of the UK with Manly United and was offered a scholarship with the youth academy.

Stalybridge Celtic
In 2010, he joined Conference North team Stalybridge Celtic.

Cambridge United
After making 71 league appearances, in 2013, he joined Conference team Cambridge United.

In 2014, he was loaned to Lincoln City to get more first team opportunities. But Cambridge soon recalled Austin, and declined Lincoln’s request for an extension to the loan. Though weeks later he signed for Brackley Town again on loan. On 31 January 2014, his loan was extended till March.

On 13 September 2014, he made his professional debut for Cambridge United against Dagenham and Redbridge

In May 2015, Cambridge United announced, that Austin was one out of 12 players, who would leave the club in the summer 2015 expressing his wish to return to Australia .

Central Coast Mariners
On 1 June 2015, Central Coast Mariners announced that they had signed Austin to a two-year contract. After making 23 appearances in the first year of his contract, Austin asked to terminate his second year and was released by Central Coast Mariners.

Melbourne Victory
On 17 June 2016, Melbourne Victory confirmed the signing of Austin as a straight swap for winger Connor Pain.

He made an outstanding start to his Victory career, earning Man of the Match honours in the club's pre-season friendly win over Juventus at the MCG.

Austin suffered an anterior cruciate ligament injury in training in November 2017, ruling him out for several months.

On 1 February 2018, Austin was selected to represent Melbourne Victory in the E-League's inaugural season, alongside Mouad Zwed, becoming one of a handful of professional football players to compete in e-sports as well.

Partick Thistle
Austin signed with Scottish Championship club Partick Thistle in July 2019 on a one year deal. Austin chose kit number 77 for the 2019–20 season. On 11 January 2020, Austin made his first team debut after suffering an injury in July 2019. Austin only made two appearances for Patrick Thistle before the season was cut short due to the COVID-19 pandemic. Austin left Thistle in March 2020 during the pandemic to return home to his family in Australia.

Career statistics

Honours
Cambridge United

FA Trophy: 2013–14

References

External links
 

1991 births
A-League Men players
Association football wingers
Australian soccer players
Brackley Town F.C. players
Cambridge United F.C. players
Central Coast Mariners FC players
English Football League players
Lincoln City F.C. players
Living people
Melbourne Victory FC players
Newcastle Jets FC players
Sydney FC players
National League (English football) players
Scottish Professional Football League players
Stalybridge Celtic F.C. players
Partick Thistle F.C. players